Micky van de Ven (born 19 April 2001) is a Dutch professional footballer who plays as a defender for VfL Wolfsburg.

International career
In October 2022, van de Ven was included in the preliminary Netherlands squad for the 2022 FIFA World Cup.

Career statistics

Club

Notes

References

External links

Profile at the VfL Wolfsburg website

2001 births
Living people
Dutch footballers
Association football defenders
FC Volendam players
VfL Wolfsburg players
Bundesliga players
Eerste Divisie players
Tweede Divisie players
Dutch expatriate footballers
Expatriate footballers in Germany